Senator Bass may refer to:

Charles Bass (born 1952), New Hampshire State Senate
James O. Bass (1910–2019), Tennessee State Senate
John Bass (politician) (1926–2007), Missouri State Senate
Perkins Bass (1912–2011), New Hampshire State Senate
Randy Bass (born 1954), Oklahoma State Senate
Robert P. Bass (1873–1960), New Hampshire State Senate
Ross Bass (1918–1993), U.S. Senator from Tennessee from 1964 to 1967